Andrés Tambornino is an Argentine film editor, film director, and screenplay writer.

He works in the cinema of Argentina.

Filmography
Director and writer
 Aqueronte (1994)
 Dónde y cómo Oliveira perdió a Achala (1995)
 El Descanso (2002)

Editor
 Pizza, birra, faso (1998)  Pizza, Beer, and Cigarettes
 Buenos Aires 100 kilómetros (2004)
 Camisea (2005)

Production designer
 Mundo grúa (1999) a.k.a. Crane World

External links
 
 

Argentine film editors
Living people
Year of birth missing (living people)
Place of birth missing (living people)